Amaurobius longipes is a species of spider in the family Amaurobiidae, found in Greece.

References

longipes
Spiders of Europe
Spiders described in 1995